Lo-Fi-Fnk is a Swedish electropop-band formed in 2001 consisting of Leonard Drougge and August Hellsing. They have released two EPs, We Is in 2002 and ...And the JFG? in 2005. On April 24, 2006, they released their first studio album, Boylife. Since then they started touring the world, and in 2008, they started working on their second album, The Last Summer, which was released in August 2011.

History

Formation
Lo-Fi-Fnk started out as an electronic act in 2001 when band members Leonard Drougge and August Hellsing entered a talent show in their high school.

Boylife
The debut album "Boylife" was released in Scandinavia on April 24, 2006 by the label La Vida Locash and throughout the rest of Europe on August 28 by Moshi Moshi.

Following the album Lo-Fi-Fnk embarked on a massive tour. In 2007 they played more than 100 shows in Europe and North America.  

In 2007, the track “Change Channel” was included in the Xbox 360 game Dancing Stage Universe.

Want U, Marchin' In & Sleepless
Lo-Fi-Fnk followed their debut album in 2008 with the song ‘Want U’, which was included on the French Label Kitsuné ’s compilation ‘Kitsuné Maison Compilation 6’.

In February 2010, they self-released the song Marchin’ In for free which received favourable reviews from music media like Pitchfork and NME.

In August 2010, the song "Sleepless" was released on Moshi Moshi which was described by British newspaper The Guardian as "...a gorgeous slice of piano-inflected dance pop".

The Last Summer
In 2011, Lo-Fi-Fnk released their second album ‘The Last Summer’ on Sony Music / Columbia Records.
The album was followed by a tour covering Europe, as well as North and South America.

Can U Feel It, U Don't Feel The Same and a third album
In late 2014, Lo-Fi-Fnk released the song Can U Feel It, which featured singing parts and additional production by fellow Swedish artist Duvchi. Can U Feel It was followed by yet another song in early 2015: "U Don't Feel The Same", which premiered on music website Stereogum, and it was announced that a third album was on its way.

Discography

Albums
 Boylife (2006, La Vida Locash, Moshi Moshi Music, Cooperative Music)
 The Last Summer (2011, Sony Music / Columbia Records )
 Nightclub Nirvana (2015, Columbia Records)

EPs
 We Is (2002, La Vida Locash)
 (...And the JFG?) (2005, La Vida Locash)

Singles
 "Change Channel" (Jan 2006 Moshi Moshi )
 "City" (June 2007 Moshi Moshi )
 "Sleepless" (September 2010 Moshi Moshi )
 "Boom" (June 2011 Sony Music / Columbia Records )
 "Kissing Taste" (February 2012 Sony Music / Columbia Records )
 "Shut The World Out" (June 2012 Sony Music / Columbia Records )

Remixes
Dibaba – "The Truth Blending Consortium"
Karin Ström – "Psykos"
Softlightes – "Girlkillsbear"
Le Tigre – "After Dark"
The Feeling – "Love It When You Call"
The Alpine – "Trigger"
Hot Club de Paris – "Your Face Looks All Wrong"
The Russian Futurists – "Paul Simon"
Fed MUSIC – "Yesterday Stories"
Unklejam – "Stereo"
Mika – "Big Girl (You Are Beautiful)"
Shout Out Louds – "Impossible"
GoodBooks – "Turn It Back"
The Black Ghosts – "Face"
Jeppe – "Lucky Boy"
Casiokids – "Fot i Hose"
Yelle – "Mon Pays"
Lissi Dancefloor Disaster – "Pop Musiiic"

References

External links 
 
 Lo-Fi-Fnk on Soundcloud
 Lo-Fi-Fnk on Facebook
 Article:  One Night with Lo Fi FNK UKEvents.net

2001 establishments in Sweden
Electronic music duos
Musical groups established in 2001
Musical groups from Stockholm
Swedish electronic music groups
Swedish indie pop groups
Swedish musical duos
Columbia Records artists
Moshi Moshi Records artists